Coleophora areniphila is a moth of the family Coleophoridae that can be found on the Canary Islands (Fuerteventura), Tunisia and Algeria.

References

External links

areniphila
Moths of Africa
Moths described in 1957